Frank Weylert (né Johansen; 27 June 1921 – 25 December 2007) was a Norwegian singer and actor.

Personal life
Weylert was born in Kristiania on 27 June 1921, a son of Oskar Emanuel Johansen and Olga Elisabeth Ericsson. He married Olga Alfhild Tobiassen in 1958.

Career
Weylert made his stage debut at Edderkoppen Theatre in 1946. From 1950 to 1961 he worked for Lewis & Young Productions in Los Angeles. He played at the Swedish touring theatre Riksteatern from 1963 to 1968. From 1968 he was assigned at Rogaland Teater in Stavanger, where he played about 80 different characters until his resignment in 1991.

References

1921 births
2007 deaths
Musicians from Oslo
Norwegian male stage actors
Norwegian expatriates in the United States
Norwegian expatriates in Sweden
20th-century Norwegian painters
Norwegian male painters
20th-century Norwegian male singers
20th-century Norwegian singers
20th-century Norwegian male artists